Göritz is a river of Thuringia, Germany. It is a right tributary of the Steinach, which it joins near the town Steinach.

See also
List of rivers of Thuringia

Rivers of Thuringia
Rivers of Germany